Falls is a surname. Notable people with the surname include:

Charles Buckles Falls (1874-1960), American artist and illustrator
Colin Falls (born 1985), American basketball player
Kevin Falls, American television writer
Mike Falls (born 1934), American football player
Robert Falls (born 1954), American theatre director

See also
Fall (surname)